Sila Uma (Power of the mind) is fourth and most acclaimed album from Saint Petersburg band Kirpichi. Its music is mostly hip hop with blend of other genres like nu metal, rapcore and lo-fi. Kirpichi's members consider this album as a "nonconformistic Do-It-Yourself product". Two of the album's singles have music videos: "Dzedai" and "Shkolnichki".

Track listing 

marked as * is available only in cassette version

References

2002 albums
Kirpichi albums